The doctrine of signatures, dating from the time of Dioscorides and Galen, states that herbs resembling various parts of the body can be used by herbalists to treat ailments of those body parts. A theological justification, as stated by botanists such as William Coles, was that God would have wanted to show men what plants would be useful for.

It is today considered to be pseudoscience, and has led to many deaths and severe illnesses. For instance birthwort (so-called because of its resemblance to the uterus), once used widely for pregnancies, is carcinogenic and very damaging to the kidneys, owing to its aristolochic acid content. As a defense against predation, many plants contain toxic chemicals, the action of which is not immediately apparent, or easily tied to the plant rather than other factors

History 
The concept dates from the time of Dioscorides and Galen.
Paracelsus (1493–1541) developed the concept, writing that "Nature marks each growth ... according to its curative benefit", and it was followed by Giambattista della Porta in his Phytognomonica (1588).

The writings of Jakob Böhme (1575–1624) spread the doctrine of signatures. He suggested that God marked objects with a sign, or "signature", for their purpose.
Plants bearing parts that resembled human body-parts, animals, or other objects were thought to have useful relevance to those parts, animals or objects. The "signature" could sometimes also be identified in the environments or specific sites in which plants grew. Böhme's 1621 book The Signature of All Things gave its name to the doctrine. The English physician-philosopher Sir Thomas Browne in his discourse The Garden of Cyrus (1658) uses the Quincunx pattern as an archetype of the 'doctrine of signatures' pervading the design of gardens and orchards, botany and the Macrocosm at large.

The 17th century botanist William Coles supposed that God had made 'Herbes for the use of men, and hath given them particular Signatures, whereby a man may read ... the use of them.' Coles's The Art of Simpling and Adam in Eden, stated that walnuts were good for curing head ailments because in his opinion, "they Have the perfect Signatures of the Head". Regarding Hypericum, he wrote, "The little holes whereof the leaves of Saint Johns wort are full, doe resemble all the pores of the skin and therefore it is profitable for all hurts and wounds that can happen thereunto."

A theological justification was made for this philosophy: "It was reasoned that the Almighty must have set his sign upon the various means of curing disease which he provided".

For the late medieval viewer, the natural world was vibrant with images of the Deity: 'as above, so below,' a Hermetic principle expressed as the relationship between macrocosm and microcosm; the principle is rendered sicut in terra.  Michel Foucault expressed the wider usage of the doctrine of signatures, which rendered allegory more real and more cogent than it appears to a modern eye:

Signatures of some plants used in herbalism 

The concept of signatures is reflected in the common names of some plants whose shapes and colors reminded herbalists of the parts of the body where they were thought to do good, as for instance:

 Eyebright, used for eye infections
 Hedge woundwort, thought to have antiseptic qualities
 Liverwort, either Marchantiophyta or Hepatica – used to treat the liver
 Lungwort – used for pulmonary infections
 Spleenwort, Asplenium – used to treat the spleen
 Toothwort, Dentaria – used for tooth ailments

Concepts similar to the doctrine of signatures may be found in folk or indigenous medicines, and in modern alternative medicines.

In literature 

The phrase "signatures of all things" appears in the beginning of episode 3 in James Joyce's novel Ulysses. The character Stephen Dedalus walking along the beach, thinking to himself "Signatures of all things I am here to read, seaspawn and seawrack, the nearing tide, that rusty boot". The Canadian poet Anne Szumigalski, 1922–1999, entitled her third full-length collection Doctrine of Signatures.

Scientific skepticism 

The signatures are described as post hoc attributions and mnemonics, of value only in creating a system for remembering actions attributed to medical herbs. There is no scientific evidence that plant shapes and colors help in the discovery of medical uses of plants.

Another explanation is that the human mind, in trying to find patterns to explain phenomena, while lacking adequate scientific knowledge, resorts to anthropomorphism.

See also 
 Table of magical correspondences
 Sympathetic magic
 Naturalistic fallacy
 Pictogram

References 
Citations

Bibliography

Further reading 
 Boehme, Jakob (1651) Signatura Rerum (The Signature of All Things). Gyles Calvert.
--- Translation by J. Ellistone.
 Buchanan, Scott Milross (1938) The doctrine of signatures: a defense of theory in medicine.
 Cole, W. (1657) Adam in Eden or Nature's Paradise. J Streater for Nathanial Brooke.
 Conrad, L.I.; M Neve, V Nutton and R Porter (1995). The Western Medical Tradition, 800 BC – 1800 AD. Cambridge University Press.
 Porter, Roy (1997) The Greatest Benefit to Mankind: A Medical History of Humanity from Antiquity to the Present. HarperCollins.

Obsolete medical theories
Herbalism
History of science
Pseudoscience